The East Germany women's national handball team was the national handball team of East Germany. The team won the World Women's Handball Championship three times, in 1971, 1975 and 1978.

Olympic Games history 
 1976 :  2nd place
 1980 :  3rd place

World Championship history 
 1971 :  Champions
 1973 : 9th place
 1975 :  Champions
 1978 :  Champions
 1982 : 4th place
 1986 : 4th place
 1990 :  3rd place

See also 
 Germany women's national handball team

References

Handball
Women's national handball teams
Former national handball teams
Women's handball in Germany
Women's national team